The Chapel of Christ the Teacher is a chapel on the University of Portland campus, in Portland, Oregon, United States. It was designed by Pietro Belluschi and completed in 1986.

References

External links
 

1986 establishments in Oregon
Buildings and structures completed in 1986
Buildings and structures in Portland, Oregon
Chapels in the United States
Pietro Belluschi buildings
University of Portland campus